The 2021 Men's EuroHockey Club Trophy I was the 44th edition of Europe's secondary men's club field hockey tournament organized by the European Hockey Federation and the first edition since it was renamed from the EuroHockey Club Trophy to the EuroHockey Club Trophy I. It was held from 30 September to 3 October 2021 at Post SV Wien in Vienna, Austria.

Montrouge won their first title by defeating the hosts Post SV 5–0 in the final. Rotweiss Wettingen won the bronze medal by defeating Stroitel Brest 4–3 in a shoot-out after the match finished 2–2.

Teams
The following six teams with the following seeding participated in the tournament. Cardiff & Met and Western Wildcats withdrew before the tournament.

 Montrouge
 Pomorzanin Torun
 Stroitel Brest
 Rotweiss Wettingen
 OKS Vinnitsa
 Post SV

Preliminary round

Pool A

Pool B

Classification round

Fifth place game

Third place game

Final

Final standings
 Montrouge
 Post SV
 Rotweiss Wettingen
 Stroitel Brest
 OKS Vinnitsa
 Pomorzanin Torun

See also
2021 Euro Hockey League
2021 Men's EuroHockey Club Trophy II
2021 Women's EuroHockey Club Trophy

References

Men's EuroHockey Club Trophy I
Club Trophy I
International field hockey competitions hosted by Austria
EuroHockey Club Trophy I
EuroHockey Club Trophy I
Sports competitions in Vienna
EuroHockey Club Trophy I
2020s in Vienna
EuroHockey Club Trophy I